Ginette Aumassip is a French geologist and specialist in African prehistory. She is the former director of the Laboratory for Research on Africa under the auspices of CNRS. She taught African prehistory at various universities and, from 1970 to 1986, ran the scholarly journal Libyca. A resident of Algiers, she also researched the origins of the earliest settlers of Algeria.

She conducted numerous archaeological investigations in the Sahara, including major excavations in the Bas Sahara and in Tassili n'Ajjer. These allowed her to identify various local cultures, locate them in space and time, and follow their evolution and adaptation to an increasingly arid environment. Her work has focused on understanding Saharan populations and the settlement of North Africa.

She has written several books on the prehistory of the Sahara.

Publications
 Le Bas-Sahara dans la préhistoire ( 1 September 1986)
 Chronologies de l'art rupestre saharien et nord africain (1993)
 L'Algérie Des Premiers Hommes (2001)
 Préhistoire du Sahara et de ses abords : Tome 1, Au temps des chasseurs : Le Paléolithique (1 February 2004)
 Préhistoire du Sahara et de ses abords: Tome 2 - Le Neolithique ou le temps des producteurs (25 July 2019)

References

French geologists
French archaeologists
French women archaeologists
Living people
French women geologists
Year of birth missing (living people)
Place of birth missing (living people)